Jump list may refer to:

Jump lists, menu options available on taskbar icons in Microsoft Windows
Skip list, a probabilistic data structure

See also
Jumplist